Percy Bice (21 September 1915 – 24 November 1985) was  a former Australian rules footballer who played with Richmond in the Victorian Football League (VFL).

While undergoing military training, Bice had signed with South Melbourne, but he was cleared to join the Tigers, and went into the senior squad for his debut without playing a Reserves, U19s, or even a practice match with the club. Bice's VFL career ended after only 6 games when he was transferred with his military unit.

Notes

External links 
		

1915 births
1985 deaths
Australian rules footballers from South Australia
Richmond Football Club players
Norwood Football Club players